Clarence Abiodun Peters (born 27 July 1978) is a Nigerian music video director, filmmaker and cinematographer. He is the founder and CEO of Capital Dream Pictures, a production company that specialises in the realms of the performing arts, film and video. He is also the founder and CEO of Capital Hill Records, a record label home to Chidinma, Tha Suspect and Illbliss. He was ranked 2nd on Channel O's list of the Top 10 Most Visionary Music Video Directors.

In 1998, Peters was involved in a Mobil-sponsored music video for a documentary on AIDS. He directed 40 episodes of the TV series Everyday People. Peters has directed music videos for recording artists across an array of genres and generations, including Darey, Durella, and Wizkid. In 2012, he shot the music video for Shuga's theme song, which was recorded by Boneye from P-Unit, Banky W., Wizkid and L-Tido. Peters has also shot a good number of documentaries, TV commercials, short films, and TV features. In April 2014, Absolut Vodka honoured him for his creativity.

In September 2015, Peters announced plans to premiere his 25-minute horror film  Hex. The first official trailer was released on 28 September 2015.

Life and career
Peters is the son of Sir Shina Peters, a musician, and Clarion Chukwura, an actress from Anambra State, Nigeria. In an interview posted on the Daily Times of Nigeria website, his mother opened up about wanting to abort him while he was in her womb, but changed her mind because of her belief that Peters was the reincarnation of her father who she lost when she was 11 years old.

Growing up, Peters was a footballer. He attended Beehive primary school and then Government College Ikorodu. After finishing secondary school, he worked at Alpha Visions for three years. He studied Cinematography at City Varsity, a film school in Cape Town, South Africa. Upon returning to Nigeria, Peters teamed up with a group of filmmakers to establish the Alliance Film Company, which is now known as the Allied Film Company. Peters worked with the company for a year and eventually started his own production company.

Peters has cited Steven Spielberg, Hype Williams, DJ Tee, Akin Alabi, Wudi Awa, HG2films, Director dove Kemi Adetiba, Sesan, Aje, and AK 1 as people he admires.

Capital Hill Music
While in secondary school, Peters met Tha Suspect, a record producer and recording artist. The two started a group after becoming acquainted with each other. Capital Hill Records was formed after Peters returned to Nigeria from South Africa. He and Suspect decided to look for a female artist who could rap and sing. At a later date, Peters signed Kel to his record label after being introduced to her by Terry tha Rapman. In September 2010, Kel had a misunderstanding with Peters, which led to the termination of her recording contract. The rapper managed to release her debut studio album, The Investment, while signed to the label. Latterly, the label partnered with the Goretti Company, a management company owned by Illbliss.

Controversy
In January 2014, a copyright infringement was levelled against Peters after the release of Tiwa Savage's "Eminado" video. He allegedly stole the vintage nature of the "Asinamali" video, which was released by Tumi and the Volume to honour the artistic works of Seydou Keïta. Tumi slandered Peters on Twitter and urged his fans to shine a light on the issue. Savage's former manager and ex-husband, Tunji "Tee Billz" Balogun, shed light on the controversy. He said they never knew that the video's concept was adopted from another video, and were surprised as everyone else.

After the release of Ice Prince's "VIP" music video on 21 June 2013, Peters was accused of plagiarising scenes from Slaughterhouse's "My Life" video and incorporating them into the "V.I.P" video. In February 2014, Ice Prince defended the actions of Peters and said he told him the ideas to shoot. He also said that if anyone has a problem with the situation, they should hold him responsible.

Awards and nominations

Videography

See also
 List of Nigerian film producers
 List of Nigerian cinematographers
 List of Nigerian film directors
 Emamode Edosio

Notes
A. Peters co-directed "Alingo" with Jude Engees Okoye.
B. The song is the theme song for the television series ''Shuga.

References

Filmmakers from Ibadan
Living people
Nigerian film directors
Nigerian cinematographers
Nigerian music video directors
Nigerian music industry executives
Yoruba filmmakers
The Headies winners
1978 births
Nigerian film producers
Nigerian documentary filmmakers